"My Baby Just Cares for Me" is a jazz standard written by Walter Donaldson with lyrics by Gus Kahn.  Written for the film version of the musical comedy Whoopee! (1930), the song became a signature tune for Eddie Cantor who sang it in the movie. A stylized version of the song by American singer and songwriter Nina Simone, recorded in 1957, was a top 10 hit in the United Kingdom after it was used in a 1987 perfume commercial and resulted in a renaissance for Simone.

Recordings
  
 Ted Weems, (vocal by Art Jarrett) – this reached the charts of the day in 1930
 Jack Payne (1930)
 Isham Jones (1930)
 Harry James (1946)
 Nat King Cole (1949)
 Mel Tormé
 Dean Martin (1952)
 The Hi-Lo's – this briefly reached the Billboard charts in 1954.
 Tony Bennett (1955)
 Somethin' Smith and the Redheads (1955)
 Bing Crosby (1956) for use on his radio show and it was subsequently included in the box set The Bing Crosby CBS Radio Recordings (1954–56) issued by Mosaic Records (catalog MD7-245) in 2009. 
 Jane Powell (1957)
 Frankie Lymon & The Teenagers (1957)
 Gene Kelly (1957)
 Nina Simone (1957), reissued in 1985, and after re-entering the UK charts in 1987 it hit #5 (UK)
 Tommy Dorsey (1958)
 Pat Boone (1958)
 Marlene Dietrich (1961)
 Count Basie (vocalist Joe Williams) (1962)
 Al Hirt and Ann-Margret (1963)
 Vic Damone (1963)
 Julie London (1964)
 Frank Sinatra (1966)
 Cornell Campbell (1975)
 Frighty & Colonel Mite (1990)
 The Temperance Seven "The Writing On The Wall" album (1992)
 Edward Norton (1996) in the musical film Everyone Says I Love You
 Alex Chilton (1997)
 Indigo Swing (1998)
 George Michael (1999)
 Katharine Whalen's Jazz Squad (1999)
 Natalie Cole (2002)
 Cyndi Lauper (2003)
 Sophie Milman (2004)
 Delicatessen (2009)
 Renee Olstead (2009)
 Florence Welch and Jools (2009)
 Jimmy Barnes (2010)
 Andrea Motis and Joan Chamorro (2011)
 Ana Cañas (2012)
 Aga Zaryan (2013)
 Harmony Keeney (2014)
 Usher (2015)
 Katie Noonan (2015)
 Michael Bublé (2016)
 Haley Reinhart (2018)

Nina Simone recording

Simone recorded the song in late 1957 for her debut album, Little Girl Blue, released in February 1959. The track remained relatively obscure until 1987, when it was used in a UK television commercial for Chanel No. 5 perfume. This single also made the top 10 in several European single charts and peaked at number one in the Dutch Top 40. At this time there was also a twelve inch single released, Special Extended Smoochtime Version, with a 5.23 running time.

The Simone version of the song was featured on the soundtrack for the 1992 film Peter's Friends, the 1994 film Shallow Grave, and the 1996 film Stealing Beauty.

Music video
In 1987 a claymation music video was produced for "My Baby Just Cares for Me" by Aardman Animations and directed by Peter Lord. The video prominently features live action footage showing details of a piano, brushes on a snare drum, and a double bass as they play the song. The two focal characters are represented by a singing cat in a club and the cat who is in love with her.

Charts

Certifications

References

External links
 

1930 songs
1958 singles
1985 singles
1987 singles
Songs with music by Walter Donaldson
Songs with lyrics by Gus Kahn
Eddie Cantor songs
George Michael songs
Nina Simone songs
Amanda Lear songs
Al Hirt songs
UK Independent Singles Chart number-one singles
Dutch Top 40 number-one singles
Pop standards